John Murray ( – 17 October 1933) was a Scottish footballer who played as an inside forward.

Career
Murray played club football for Renton and Dundee, and made one appearance for Scotland against Wales in March 1895. He was runner-up in the Scottish Cup with Renton in 1895.

References

1870s births
1933 deaths
Scottish footballers
Scotland international footballers
Scottish Football League players
Renton F.C. players
Dundee F.C. players
Association football inside forwards
Year of birth uncertain
Place of birth missing
Place of death missing